Giertych may refer to :

Jędrzej Giertych (1903–1992), Polish politician, journalist and writer
Maciej Giertych (born 1936), Polish dendrologist, son of Jędrzej
Wojciech Giertych (born 1951), Polish Theologian of Pontifical Household, son of Jędrzej
Roman Giertych (born 1971), Polish politician, son of Maciej

References 

Polish-language surnames